Phulhan is a village near Hanumanganj post office in Allahabad district of Uttar Pradesh Province in northern India. The village has a population of 510 and increasing.

Villages in Allahabad district